The Royal Treatment is a 2022 American romance film directed by Rick Jacobson and written by Holly Hester. It stars Laura Marano as Manhattan hairdresser Izzy, who is given an opportunity to work at the wedding of Prince Thomas, played by Mena Massoud.

After its release on January 20, 2022 on Netflix, The Royal Treatment became the week's most-watched film on the streaming service. However, it received negative reviews from critics. With the exception of Massoud, Marano, Jay Simon and Paul Norell, the majority of the cast is from New Zealand which is where the movie was filmed.

Plot
Izzy (Isabella) is a hairdresser. One day, the microwave in her salon causes a fire. The assistant of the salon's landlord, Doug, asks for payment for the damage so she gives the money she had saved for traveling the world.

The prince of Lavania, Prince Thomas, asks his assistant Walter to schedule a haircut. Walter mistakenly calls up Izzy's salon, telling her that she will be paid $500 for the haircut. Izzy agrees. When she meets the prince and starts cutting his hair, a housekeeper comes with tea and accidentally drops it. Izzy is upset at how badly the housekeeper is treated and leaves without finishing the Prince's haircut. She returns to the salon, where Thomas comes in to finish the haircut. Afterward, Izzy agrees to walk the prince back to the metro and the two share a fun night.

The next day Thomas, his fiancée Lauren, and her mother discuss who to hire as the makeup artists for the wedding. Prince Thomas's assistant recommends Izzy's salon. Her salon agrees and they travel to Lavania. Another assistant, Madam Fabre, tests their makeup skills. Izzy passes but her coworkers don't so Madam Fabre trains them. Izzy goes to see the province and Thomas accompanies her.

The next day, Thomas states to his family that he wants to do more for the locals. Izzy encourages the locals to donate to the less fortunate children by leaving items at the castle gate. Lauren tells Thomas that she wants part of their new estate to be for her work studio. Thomas finds the guard house full of donated toys for the children. Izzy and Thomas drive the toys and some royal furniture to the orphanage.

Lauren's mother observes that Thomas and Izzy are getting too close. Lauren is not concerned, commenting that she would rather focus on her business ideas than marry someone she barely knows. When a photo of them ends up in the papers, Izzy is asked to leave. It is revealed that the reason why the King and Queen want Thomas to marry Lauren is because her family could help them get out of debt.

On the wedding day, Walter tells Thomas that he knows Thomas is in love with Izzy. Thomas tells Lauren he can’t marry her. She is relieved as she also does not want to get married. Izzy returns to find that there was a major fire in the salon. When Doug visits asking for money, she tells him that she had spoken with the owner, who had expected Doug to rewire the property last year. The family makes plans to refurbish the salon but Izzy tells them she doesn’t want to work at the salon anymore, instead choosing to be director of a local community center.

Prince Thomas rides to Izzy's house on horseback and confesses his feelings for her. The movie ends with them going to get gelato on horseback.

Cast 
Laura Marano as Isabella "Izzy"
Mena Massoud as Prince Thomas
Chelsie Preston-Crayford as Destiny
 Grace Bentley-Tsibuah as Lola
Cameron Rhodes as Walter
Jay Simon as Doug
 Sonia Gray as Madame Fabre
 Elizabeth Hawthorne as Nonna
 Amanda Billing as Valentina
 James Gaylyn as Nate
 Paul Norell as King John
 Teuila Blakely as Queen Catherine
 Jacque Drew as Ruth LaMott
 Phoenix Connolly as Lauren LaMott
 Matthew E. Morgan	as Buddy LaMott

Production
Filming began in both  Dunedin and Oamaru in New Zealand in February 2021. Film production involved 30 actors, 100 extras, and a sizeable film crew. Notable film locations included Vogel Street (which stood in for New York City), Fable Dunedin Hotel, Larnach Castle, and Olveston Historic Home (the latter two of which stood in for the Lavania royal palace), the Otago Peninsula, the University of Otago Registry Building, and Oamaru's Victorian precinct.

The film was released on January 20, 2022, on Netflix. It reached the number 1 spot on Netflix the week of its release.

Reception

 

Courtney Howard of Variety gave the film a positive review and wrote that it "takes expected genre trappings and infuses them with unexpected delights, creating an enlightened, enchanting and entertaining feature."

Lindsey Bahr of the Associated Press awarded the film one and a half stars out of four and wrote, "Like a drug store chocolate bar, it just is. It might not be good for you, but it’ll go down shockingly easy, give you a minor sugar high (and possible headache) and disappear from your memory just as quickly..."

James Croot of Stuff described the film as a "flimsy, forgettable rom-com farce." He also criticised Holly Hester's script, likening it to an early treatment rather than a "fully formed" screenplay. Croot described Marano's character Izzy as one-dimensional and noted the New Zealand accents of the non-royal Lavanian characters.

References

External links
 
 

2020s English-language films
2022 romance films
American romance films
English-language Netflix original films
Films shot in New Zealand
Films directed by Rick Jacobson
2020s American films